Dato' Gan Ee Kiang (born 23 June 1944) is a Malaysian pharmacologist. He is Professor of Pharmacology at the University of Science, Malaysia, and currently holds the honorary office of Chancellor of the International Medical University in Kuala Lumpur.

He joined the University of Science in 1977 and was Dean of School of Pharmaceutical Sciences from 1979 to 1995. He has also served as an adviser to the World Health Organization. From 1999 to 2013 he was Managing Director of the USAINS Group, the commercial arm of the University of Science. He is a member of the Board of Directors of several companies.

He earned a PhD in Pharmacology at the University of Western Australia in 1972 under the supervision of Mary Fauriel Lockett, the first female professor in Australia.

Honours
Pingat Kelakuan Terpuji (PKT, 1986), state award of Penang
Bintang Cemerlang Negeri (BCN, 1997), state award of Penang
Darjah Setia Pangkuan Negeri (DSPN, 2004), state award of Penang
Johan Mangku Negara (JMN, 1999), Malaysian federal award

References

Living people
Malaysian pharmacologists
1944 births
Academic staff of the International Medical University
Companions of the Order of the Defender of the Realm